David Robert Michael (born 25 January 1980) is an Australian politician. He has been a Labor member of the Western Australian Legislative Assembly since the 2017 state election, representing Balcatta. Michael is the WA Parliament's first MP of Finnish descent.

Michael worked for several state Labor MPs, and ran unsuccessfully for Churchlands in 2001. In 2005 he was elected to City of Stirling council, becoming its youngest ever member, aged 25. He served as deputy mayor from 2011 to 2013.

Michael's current priorities as MP are upgrades to Balcatta Senior High School and Osborne Park Hospital and for the McGowan Government as is the Stephenson Avenue Extension.

In March 2021, he was appointed as the Cabinet Secretary to the returned McGowan Labor Government, after having served as Government Whip since the 2017 election.

Michael also acts in the following roles for various organizations:

 Minister for Police’s representative on the State Graffiti Taskforce
 Chair of the Local Government Act Review Panel
 Chair of the Stephenson Avenue Project Steering Group; and
 WA Labor's state returning officer

Michael is aligned with the right faction of WA Labor (Progressive Labor).

Personal life
Growing up in Tuart Hill, Michael went to Tuart Hill Primary School and Servite College for his education. He is a life member of the Tuart Hill Cricket Club, a board member of Tuart Hill Primary School, and a patron of the Osborne Park Bowling Club. Michael enjoys playing cricket, and he supports the Perth Wildcats, Fremantle Dockers and Claremont Tigers.

References

1980 births
Living people
Australian Labor Party members of the Parliament of Western Australia
Members of the Western Australian Legislative Assembly
Australian people of Finnish descent
21st-century Australian politicians
Deputy mayors of places in Australia
Western Australian local councillors